Bangladesh Fisheries Information Share Home (BdFISH) is a global online database of information about fish species of Bangladesh. It is the largest and most extensively accessed online database on fishes of Bangladesh on the web. Over time it has "evolved into a dynamic and versatile ecological tool", widely cited in fisheries educational institutions of Bangladesh.

Bangladesh Fisheries Information Share Home provides comprehensive data, including information  such as identification keys, broodstock, spawning, nursery behaviour, prey and predators, and growth stages, geographical distribution, biometrics and morphology, behaviour and habitats, ecology and population dynamics as well as reproductive, metabolic and genetic data on fishes of Bangladesh.  It also includes information of specific interest to aquaculturists and techniques for rearing fish and other aquatic organisms of commercial importance of Bangladesh.

Bangladesh Fisheries Information Share Home included descriptions in multilingual 2 languages and aims to include all the key data on fishes of Bangladesh, with an emphasis on standardizing the data, making it easy to extract and combine data with other data, and offering powerful presentation tools.

History

The origins of Bangladesh Fisheries Information Share Home go back to the 2007s when the fisheries scientist ABM Mohsin and his students Shams Galib and Md Mehedi Hasan found themselves struggling for collecting data about the fishes (ornamental, exotic and native species) of Bangladesh. It can be difficult for fisheries, aquaculture and hatchery scientists and managers to get the information they need on the species that concern them, because the relevant facts can be scattered and buried across numerous journal articles, reports, newsletters and other sources. It can be particularly difficult for people in developing countries who need such information. An answer to this situation is to consolidate all the available information, drawn from the global sources, into an easily accessed database.

Bangladesh Fisheries Information Share Home was subsequently extended to cover all finfish and other aquatic organisms of Bangladesh, and was launched on the Web in later of 2007. It is now the most accessed online database for fishes of Bangladesh.

Current organization

As awareness of Bangladesh Fisheries Information Share Home has grown among fish specialists, it has attracted over the related students, teachers and fishery professionals of Bangladesh. Since 2007 Bangladesh Fisheries Information Share Home is managed by a team 'BdFISH Team' and functions as the coordinating body.

Journal of Fisheries 
In 2013, BdFISH launched its maiden academic journal entitled Journal of Fisheries (ISSN 2311-729X, print; and 2311–3111, online), edited by Prof MN Islam of the University of Rajshahi. It publishes peer reviewed original articles, short communications, and reviews dealing with every aspect of fisheries science at no cost. The coverage ranges from molecular-level mechanistic studies to investigations at the whole ecosystem scale, including aquatic ecology. Journal of Fisheries publishes articles not only focusing research across disciplinary and environmental boundaries, but also studies highlighting interactions with aquatic habitats and biota within the habitats, at both inter and/or intra–levels. The journal is indexed in Core Collections of the Web of Science database (Emerging Sources Citation Index), Directory of Open Access Journals (DOAJ), Chemical Abstracts Service (CAS), Google Scholar and so on.

References

 Department of Fisheries, University of Rajshahi, Bangladesh
 DoF.Bangladesh
 BdFISH
 Bangladesh National Infokosh

External links
Bangladesh Agriculture University. Bangladesh
Jessore Science and Technology University. Bangladesh
Hajje Mohammad Danesh Science and Technology University. Bangladesh
BdFISH team

Biological databases
Fisheries databases
Biology websites
Fishing in Bangladesh